Stewart Rudolph Weldon (born June 24, 1977) is an American serial killer, rapist, kidnapper, and habitual criminal. A Springfield, Massachusetts resident, Weldon kidnapped four women, killing three of them, around the Springfield area between December 2017 and May 2018. After being arrested for kidnapping and attempting to kill a woman on May 27, 2018, authorities investigated his property and found the bodies of the previous three victims. Weldon pleaded guilty to the murders on September 28, 2021, and was sentenced to three consecutive life sentences.

Early life 
Stewart Weldon was born in the Jamaica neighborhood of Queens, New York City, an area known for its high drug sales. In his early childhood, he and his family moved from New York to Montclair, New Jersey, a wealthier area. In his teenage years, Weldon's father died. Friends of Weldon would state that afterwards his mother would spoil him. 

In 1996, at age 19, Weldon and a friend named Dwight Pottinger visited a nearby mall where they chatted up with three young women. After some time, the two drove the three girls home. Two of the girls got out of the car when they arrived, but Weldon and Pottinger forced the third at gunpoint to stay. According to the then 18-year-old woman, Pottinger sexually assaulted her before driving her to her parents' house and fleeing the area. The two were later arrested for sexual assault and convicted. Sometime after getting released, Weldon was arrested in East Orange on weapons charges and kidnapping. He pleaded guilty and was sentenced to three years' probation. Years after getting off probation, Weldon was arrested for burglary. He was sentenced to one year and one day in prison. 

Upon his release, Weldon moved from New Jersey and voyaged to Springfield, Massachusetts. There, in July 2010, he was arrested for attempting to break into a liquor store but was spotted and led police on a chase. He was convicted of these crimes and sentenced to serve 18 months in prison. In 2015 he was arrested after threatening to shoot up a downtown bar. Once apprehended, Stewart punched a security guard. In October 2017, shortly after the birth of his child, Weldon was wanted on accusations of attacking a woman. Instead of complying with the cops, he led police on a high-speed chase which ended when he attempted to ram his car into a police vehicle. He was eventually apprehended and charged with assault with a dangerous weapon and assault on a police officer. His bail was set at $2,500. It was downgraded to $1,000, and his mother paid it off and Weldon was released from police custody. At the time, Weldon was living at his mother's house.

Murders

America Lyden 
America Lyden, 34, was a Springfield native. She was reported missing on December 1, 2017.

Ernestine Ryans 
Ernestine Ryans, 47, was a Springfield native. She was reported missing on March 18, 2018.

Kayla Escalante 
Kayla Escalante, 26, was a native of Ludlow, Massachusetts. She had yet to be reported missing. Her family said that they last heard from in December.

Arrest 
On May 27, 2018, while waiting at a red light, Weldon was pulled over by Springfield police after being spotted with a broken taillight. Officers approached his car but noticed a woman tied in the backseat. The woman, who was still alive, exclaimed loudly that Weldon kidnapped her. Weldon was quickly arrested and taken into custody. The woman was later interviewed by police, and she told them that Weldon had held her captive for over a month, continually hitting her with a hammer and raping her. She also thanked police, "Thank you for saving my life". She was treated for multiple injuries, including a fractured jaw, stab wounds, marks from being hit with a blunt instrument and a leg infection. Soon after Weldon's arrest, his mother called police and told them she was worried after noticing a "foul odor" steaming from around the house. On May 31, Law enforcement issued a warrant to seize Weldon's property at 1333 Page Boulevard. During the search, police located the origins of the foul smell – the decomposing bodies of Lyden, Ryans, and Escalante. It was also found that Weldon's arrest coincided with the end of a series of rapes that started in June 2017. By the time of Stewart's arrest, eight women had been raped in Springfield. Stewart is believed to have been the perpetrator.

Conviction 
Weldon was charged with three counts of first-degree murder, eight counts of strangulation, nine counts of aggravated rape, two counts of rape, five counts of aggravated kidnapping and four counts of kidnapping. He pleaded not guilty. His bail was set at $2,000,000. Weldon was scheduled to stand trial in April 2020; however, due to the COVID-19 pandemic, the trial was postponed. 

In October 2020, a judge ordered Weldon to undergo mental health evaluations to see if he was in fact competent to stand trial. The following September, he was ruled competent to stand trial. Jury selection was due to begin on October 6, with the trial scheduled to start on October 12. On September 28, 2021, Stewart changed turned over his not guilty plea and changed it to guilty.

On September 30, 2021, Stewart was sentenced to life terms which were to run consecutively.

See also 
 List of serial rapists
 List of serial killers in the United States

References 

1977 births
21st-century American criminals
American male criminals
American people convicted of rape
American prisoners sentenced to life imprisonment
American rapists
American serial killers
Criminals from Massachusetts
Living people
Male serial killers
People convicted of murder by Massachusetts
People from New York City
People from Springfield, Massachusetts
Prisoners sentenced to life imprisonment by Massachusetts